Winter Songs is the second album by English avant-rock group Art Bears. It was recorded at Sunrise Studio in Kirchberg, Switzerland between 22 November and 5 December 1978, and was released in 1979. It was Art Bears' first album to be recorded on their own, the bulk of their first album, Hopes and Fears (1978) having been recorded as Henry Cow.

Recording
Winter Songs comprises fourteen short songs composed by Fred Frith around texts by Chris Cutler that were based on carvings on the dado of the west facade of Amiens Cathedral in France. The whole album was recorded and mixed simultaneously, taking 14 days from start to finish. The group adopted an approach of creating the sound first and committing it to tape immediately, instead of leaving the sound detail to post-production mixing. This method used the studio as a compositional instrument, and Etienne Conod, the studio engineer at Sunrise Studio, played an important part in this process, becoming an indispensable member of the group.

Reception

In their review of the album Ground and Sky wrote: "Winter Songs often seems like the third wheel in Art Bears' trilogy of full-length releases; it is neither as overtly political nor as musically diverse as either of the albums that bookend it."

Track listing
All tracks composed by Fred Frith and Chris Cutler.

Personnel
Fred Frith – guitars, keyboards, viola, violin, xylophone
Chris Cutler – drums, percussion, noise
Dagmar Krause – voice

Sound and art work
Engineered and mixed by Etienne Conod
Produced by Art Bears and Etienne Conod
Cover art by "Art Bear IV"

CD reissues
Winter Songs and Art Bears' next album, The World as It Is Today were reissued on a single CD in 1988, entitled 25 Songs.
The album was also reissued in 2004 in The Art Box, a 6xCD box set of all Art Bears releases with live and unreleased tracks, plus remixes by other musicians.

References

External links
Chris Cutler homepage.

1979 albums
Art Bears albums
Recommended Records albums